Pay-e Zebr (also Romanized as Pāy-e Zebr; also known as Pāy Zīr) is a village in Hanza Rural District, Hanza District, Rabor County, Kerman Province, Iran. At the 2006 census, its population was 32, in 9 families.

References 

Populated places in Rabor County